Jacques Santi (11 March 1939 – 29 March 1988) was a French film producer from Paris, France. He was an actor best  known for roles such as Bob Morane (1961), The Aeronauts (1967). 

He was also nominated for a César Award a major French film award.

Filmography

Les Chevaliers du ciel - serie
Bob Morane
The Aeronauts - TV series
Une souris chez les hommes
Heaven on One's Head
A Stroke of 1000 Millions
Angelique and the Sultan (1968)

References

External links

1939 births
1988 deaths
Film people from Paris
French male film actors
French male stage actors
French male television actors
20th-century French male actors